WEHM (92.9 FM) is an adult album alternative formatted radio station licensed to Manorville, New York and serving Suffolk County, New York. WEHM's programming is simulcast on WEHN (96.9 FM) East Hampton, New York, the station which originally had been home to WEHM when it was located on 96.7 FM. WEHN's signal covers the eastern Long Island and southeastern Connecticut areas.

The stations were purchased in 2013 for $3.2 million and licensed to LRS Radio, LLC, which is owned by WEHM on-air talent Lauren Stone (68.8%) and her father Roger W. Stone (31.2%), the Chairman/CEO of Kapstone Paper & Packaging Company in Northbrook, Illinois,. Both stations broadcast from studios in Water Mill, New York alongside sister stations WBAZ and WBEA.

History 

WEHM signed on in 1993 at 96.7 MHz licensed in East Hampton to East Hampton Broadcasting. Its ownership was made up of majority owners Leonard Ackerman, a local attorney, and Mickey Shulhof, then Sony America Chairman, with minority interest held by such notables as Billy Joel, Christie Brinkley and others. The station would sign on with an Adult Contemporary format, later changing to a AAA format which proved very successful.

In 2000, then-owner AAA Entertainment obtained a construction permit for a new FM station at 92.9 MHz licensed to Southampton, New York. After several years of planning and development, the 92.9 frequency would sign on in June 2003 and would become WEHM's permanent home that July.  At that time, the 96.7 frequency took the WHBE calls and took on a Bloomberg Radio format (a move reportedly done by the influence of Michael Bloomberg).

The two WEHMs would be united in April 2006 when WHBE quietly moved up the dial from 96.7 to 96.9 MHz and began to simulcast WEHM's programming. WHBE changed their call letters to WEHN.

On June 24, 2008, the FCC approved a change in WEHM's community of license from Southampton to Manorville.

References

External links 
 

EHM
Adult album alternative radio stations in the United States
Radio stations established in 1993
Radio stations established in 2003
Mass media in Suffolk County, New York
Brookhaven, New York
Southampton (town), New York
1993 establishments in New York (state)